The L'Open 35 de Saint-Malo is a French tournament for professional female tennis players played on outdoor clay courts. The event was upgraded from the ITF Women's Circuit to the WTA 125K series in 2021. It was held in Dinan between 1996 and 2007. The tournament has been held since 1996 and since 2008 in Saint-Malo.

Past finals

Singles

Doubles

External links
Official website 
ITF search

 
ITF Women's World Tennis Tour
Clay court tennis tournaments
Tennis tournaments in France
Recurring sporting events established in 1996